Fascist Communist Revolutionaries is a various artists compilation album released on September 24, 1996 by Fifth Colvmn Records. It was the second Fifth Colvmn Records compilation and was released to celebrate the three year anniversary of the label.

Reception
Jon Worley of Aiding & Abetting gave Fascist Communist Revolutionaries a mixed review, calling the compilation "a nice a starting point for the uninitiated, but not as important for current fans" but described the tracks by Dessau, Trust Obey and Vampire Rodents as "worth the price of admission." Sonic Boom said "the album serves as an excellent example of the current FCR style with many of the FCR's own bands present as well as a handful of licensed material from European labels."

Track listing

Personnel
Adapted from the Fascist Communist Revolutionaries liner notes.

 John Bergin – cover art, design
 Zalman Fishman – executive-producer

Release history

References

External links 
 

1996 compilation albums
Industrial rock compilation albums
Fifth Colvmn Records compilation albums